Bertram Wesley Manhin (born 6 July 1934) is a Trinidad and Tobago former sports shooter. He competed in the 50 metre pistol event at the 1968 Summer Olympics.

References

External links
 

1934 births
Living people
Trinidad and Tobago male sport shooters
Olympic shooters of Trinidad and Tobago
Shooters at the 1968 Summer Olympics
People from Arima
Shooters at the 1966 British Empire and Commonwealth Games
Shooters at the 1974 British Commonwealth Games
Shooters at the 1978 Commonwealth Games
Commonwealth Games medallists in shooting
Commonwealth Games bronze medallists for Trinidad and Tobago
Medallists at the 1978 Commonwealth Games